The 1949–50 Primeira Divisão was the 16th season of top-tier football in Portugal.

Overview

It was contested by 14 teams, and S.L. Benfica won the championship.

League standings

Results

References

Primeira Liga seasons
1
Portugal